Bukowo is a municipal neighbourhood of the city of Stettin, Poland situated on the left bank of Oder river, north of the Stettin Old Town and Middle Town, south of the town of Pölitz. As of January 2011 it had a population of 3,720.

Before 1945 when Stettin was a part of Germany, the German name of this suburb was Stettin-Buchholz.

References 

Bukowo